Gerar ( Gərār, "lodging-place") was a Philistine town and district in what is today south central Israel, mentioned in the Book of Genesis and in the Second Book of Chronicles of the Hebrew Bible.

Identification
According to the International Standard Bible Encyclopedia, the biblical valley of Gerar was probably located in the area of a valley known in Arabic as Wady Sheri'a, and in Modern Hebrew as Nahal Gerar. Most commentators see the mound of Tel Haror (Hebrew) or Tell Abu Hureyra (Arabic) as representing the ancient Gerar.

Some older commentaries, such as Smith's Bible Dictionary, stated simply that Gerar was located "south of Gaza". Also, a ninth century rabbinical source (Saadia Gaon) identified Gerar with Haluza, located along the Besor River in the Negev. However, according to recent archaeological research, Haluza only dates to the Nabatean period.

Biblical accounts
Biblically, the town features in two of the three wife-sister narratives in Genesis. These record that Abraham and Isaac each stayed at Gerar, near what became Beersheba, and that each passed his wife off as his sister, leading to complications involving Gerar's Philistine king, Abimelech. (and )

The Haggadah identifies the two references to Abimelech as two separate people, the second being the first Abimelech's son, and that his original name was Benmelech ["son of the King"], but he changed his name to his father's, meaning "my father is king".

In 2 Chronicles 14:12-15, Gerar and its surrounding towns figure in the account of King Asa's defeat of Zerah's vast Cushite forces.

See also
Tell Jemmeh

References

Hebrew Bible valleys
Former populated places in Israel
Former populated places in the State of Palestine
Vayeira
Philistine cities